Al-Neelain University is a public university located in Khartoum, Sudan. It was founded in 1993.
In 2012, the university had 18 faculties with a total enrollment of 47365, making it the second biggest university in Sudan.
The university is a member of the Federation of the Universities of the Islamic World.

Faculties 
 Science and Technology
 Law
 Medicine
 Computer Sciences and Information Technology
 Medicine
 Pharmacy
 Art
 Engineering
 Education
 Optical Sciences
 School  of Medical Laboratories
 Agriculture and Fish Sciences
 Society Development
 Petroleum and Mineral
 Nursing Sciences
 Natural Therapy
 Dentistry
 Economics and Social Studies 
 Natural Therapy
 Physiotherapy

See also 
 Universities in Africa
 www.neelain.edu.sd

References 

 
Neelain
Education in Khartoum
Neelain
1955 establishments in Sudan